Lake Delta is a hamlet (and census-designated place) located in the Town of Lee in Oneida County, New York, United States. The hamlet is named after, and located on, the western shore of the Delta Reservoir.

References

Hamlets in Oneida County, New York
Hamlets in New York (state)